Puținei may refer to several villages in Romania:

 Puținei, a village in Tălpaș Commune, Dolj County
 Puținei, a village in Izvoru Bârzii Commune, Mehedinți County

See also 
 Puțintei